Trudovik is a rural locality (a settlement) in Sevsky District, Bryansk Oblast, Russia. The population was 3 as of 2010. There is 1 street.

Geography 
Trudovik is located 15 km west of Sevsk (the district's administrative centre) by road. Pushkino is the nearest rural locality.

References 

Rural localities in Sevsky District